Bryher is a civil parish in the Isles of Scilly, Cornwall, England.  It contains four buildings that are recorded in the National Heritage List for England as designated listed buildings, all of which are listed at Grade II.  This grade is the lowest of the three gradings given to listed buildings and is applied to "buildings of national importance and special interest".  The listed buildings consist of a church, a former house, and a former farmhouse with its brewhouse.

Buildings

References

Citations

Sources

Listed buildings in Cornwall
Lists of listed buildings in Cornwall
 
Isles of Scilly-related lists
Listed